Ethilon is a synthetic nonabsorbable nylon suture manufactured by Ethicon in Cornelia, Georgia.  Black in color, it is a monofilament suture that is used frequently for soft-tissue approximation and ligation. Even though it is nonabsorbable, the knot security decreases over time (in vivo) and should not be used where permanent retention is required.
Practitioners should exercise caution using such material in urinary and biliary tracts, as this can lead to calculi formation.

One of its most frequent uses is for percutaneous closures. Ethilon has good knot security and low tissue reactivity.

References

External links
Other Non-Absorbable Sutures 

Surgical suture material